Ugochukwu Ezuoke  was an Anglican bishop in Nigeria. He was the Archbishop of the Anglican Province of Aba and Bishop of Aba until 2011  when he retired and was succeeded as Archbishop by Ikechi Nwosu.

Ezuoke was consecrated as the pioneer Bishop of Umuahia on 16 January 1994 at St. Michael's Cathedral Aba.

Notes

Living people
Anglican bishops of Aba
21st-century Anglican bishops in Nigeria
Anglican archbishops of Aba
Year of birth missing (living people)
Anglican bishops of Umuahia